The Invisible Government is a 1964 non-fiction book by David Wise and Thomas B. Ross, published by Random House. The book described the operations and activities of the Central Intelligence Agency (CIA) at the time.

Christopher Wright of Columbia University wrote that the book argues "that to a significant extent major policies of the United States in the cold war are established and implemented with the help of government mechanisms and procedures that are invisible to the public and seem to lack the usual political and budgetary constraints on their activities and personnel."

The New York Times described the book as "a journalistic, dramatic narrative that may move us toward a fundamental reappraisal of where secret operations fit into a democratic nation." Wise stated that when the work was published, ordinary people generally had little knowledge of what the CIA did, and that the book "was the first serious study of the CIA’s activities", something that the CIA disliked. Wright added that "Subsequent admissions and appraisals [...] have further substantiated the reports [...] and reinforced the main thesis".

Background
Books written by former CIA employees have to be approved and censored by the agency itself; Wise and Ross were never CIA employees, so the agency had no power to censor the book. Ronald Steel of Commentary stated that "Random House was reportedly urged to suppress the book". The agency created a plan to buy as many books as possible from bookshops, but the agency did not go forward with this as Bennett Cerf, the president of Random House, informed the CIA that the company would order additional printings if the CIA bought the first printing.

Content
Much of the book focuses on CIA activities in Cuba and Southeast Asia.

Reception
The New York Times concluded that the book "forces attention on a painful and perilous dilemma we have been avoiding too long." The publication stated that "annoying carelessness of detail causes one to hope that their substantive assertions are more accurate."

Wright concluded that the authors "have done a service to scholarship by assembling evidence of the depth of this policy confusion."

Steel argued that the book should state remedies on how to curb the influence of the CIA.

References

Reference notes

Further reading
 CIA review by Charles E. Valpey (Studies in Intelligence, vol. 8 no. 4, Fall 1964). Formerly classified as confidential, released in full on September 18, 1995.
 O'Leary, Jerry Jr. The Invisible Government. Navy Magazine. July 1964. Approved for release on December 25, 2005. (the PDF includes various other newspaper articles about the book and its revelations)

External links
 Profile of the book and PDF of the book at the Internet Archive

See also 
 Neo-imperialism
 Neo-colonialism

1964 non-fiction books
Non-fiction books about the Central Intelligence Agency
Collaborative non-fiction books
Random House books